NA-217 Matiari() is a constituency for the National Assembly of Pakistan.

Members of Parliament

Since 2018: NA-223 Matiari

Election 2002 

General elections were held on 10 Oct 2002. Makhdoom Amin Fahim of PPP won by 102,059 votes.

Election 2008 

General elections were held on 18 Feb 2008. Makhdoom Amin Fahim of PPP won by 97,717 votes.

Election 2013 

General elections were held on 11 May 2013. Makhdoom Amin Fahim of PPP won by 95,724 votes and became the  member of National Assembly.

Election 2018 

General elections were held on 25 July 2018.

See also
NA-216 Tharparkar-II
NA-218 Tando Allahyar

References

External links 
Election result's official website

NA-218